Robin B. Wright is an American foreign affairs analyst, author and journalist who has covered wars, revolutions and uprisings around the world. She writes for The New Yorker and is a fellow of the U.S. Institute of Peace and the Woodrow Wilson Center.  Wright has authored five books and coauthored or edited three others.

Early life
Wright was born and raised in Ann Arbor, Michigan. She attended Pres Fleuris—Les Roches in Bluche-sur-Sierre, Switzerland. A graduate of the University of Michigan, she is the daughter of L. Hart Wright, a University of Michigan law professor and Phyllis Wright, a dancer and actress. She lives in Washington, D.C.

Career
Wright received an Alicia Patterson Journalism Fellowship in 1975 to live in Africa and write about the dismantling of Portugal's African empire.

Wright has reported from more than 140 countries on seven continents for The New Yorker, The Washington Post, The Los Angeles Times, The New York Times Magazine, The Atlantic, The Sunday Times of London, Foreign Policy (2011–2019), Foreign Affairs, CBS News, The Christian Science Monitor, and others. She did several tours as a foreign correspondent based in the Middle East, Europe, Africa, and as a roving foreign correspondent in Latin America and Asia. She formerly covered U.S. foreign policy and national security for The Washington Post. She is currently a columnist for The New Yorker.

Wright has been a fellow at Yale, Duke, Stanford, Dartmouth, the U.S. Institute of Peace, the Smithsonian's Woodrow Wilson International Center for Scholars, the Brookings Institution, the Carnegie Endowment for International Peace, the University of California at Santa Barbara, and the University of Southern California.

Wright's book Rock the Casbah: Rage and Rebellion across the Islamic world (2011) was selected as the Best Book on International Affairs by the Overseas Press Club in 2011. Among her other books, Dreams and Shadows: The Future of the Middle East (2008) was selected by both The New York Times and The Washington Post as one of the most notable books of the year.

As an analyst, Wright has appeared on NBC's Meet the Press, The Today Show, and Nightly News; CBS's Face the Nation, Morning News and Evening News; and ABC's This Week and Nightline', among many other programs.

Awards and honors
1976: Overseas Press Club Bob Considine Award for "best reporting in any medium requiring exceptional courage and initiative" for the Christian Science Monitor's coverage of the Angolan war.Overseas Press Club of America Awards Recipients. Retrieved 2021-01-16 
1989: National Magazine Award for reportage from Iran in The New Yorker2001: Georgetown University Institute for the Study of Diplomacy Weintal Prize "for most distinguished diplomatic reporting" in the Washington PostInstitute for the Study of Diplomacy. Weintal Prize for Diplomatic Reporting - Past Recipients. Retrieved 2021-01-16
2003: U.N. Correspondents Association Gold Medal for analysis and coverage of international affairs
2004: National Press Club award for diplomatic reporting
2004: American Academy of Diplomacy journalist of the year for "distinguished reporting and analysis of international affairs"
2015, May 2: honorary Doctor of Humane Letters from her alma mater, the University of Michigan.
She is the recipient of a John D. and Catherine T. MacArthur Foundation grant.

Bibliography

Robin Wright, In the Name of God: The Khomeini Decade, Simon & Schuster (October 1989) 
Booknotes interview of Wright about In the Name of God, (November 19, 1989)
Robin Wright and Doyle McManus, Flashpoints: Promise and Peril in a New World, Ballantine Books (December 22, 1992) 
Robin Wright, The Last Great Revolution: Turmoil and Transformation in Iran (2000) 

Robin Wright, Dreams and Shadows: The Future of the Middle East, Penguin Press (2008) , a New York Times Notable Book in 2008 and one of The Washington Post’s “Best Books of 2008”
Robin Wright (editor), The Iran Primer: Power, Politics, and U.S. Policy, United States Institute of Peace Press (December 1, 2010) 
Robin Wright, Rock the Casbah: Rage and Rebellion Across the Islamic World Simon & Schuster (July 19, 2011) 
Robin Wright (editor), The Islamists are Coming: Who They Really Are'' United States Institute of Peace Press (April 2012)

References

External links
Robin Wright Books
Robin Wright Blog analysis of international affairs and current crises
The Iran Primer: Power, Politics, and US Policy, website for book edited by Robin Wright

Living people
American women journalists
American non-fiction writers
American foreign policy writers
Place of birth missing (living people)
The Washington Post people
University of Michigan alumni
1948 births
21st-century American women writers